Exar Javier Rosales Sánchez (born 20 May 1984) is a Peruvian footballer who plays for Ayacucho. He is a goalscoring goalkeeper, and takes penalties for many of his sides.

International career
The goalkeeper is former member of the Peru national under-17 football team and presented his team at 2003 XXI Sudamericano Juvenil in Uruguay.

References

External links
 FUTBOLPERUANO.COM: Reportajes: Selección Sub 18
 Profile on BDFA.com
 Exar Rosales Sánchez - Pichlingfutbol
 Exar Javier Rosales Sánchez - Fútbol en Peru.com - Futbolperuano.com
 

1984 births
Living people
Footballers from Lima
Association football goalkeepers
Peruvian footballers
Club Alianza Lima footballers
Deportivo Municipal footballers
Unión Huaral footballers
Deportivo Universidad San Marcos footballers
Sport Boys footballers
Juan Aurich footballers
Atlético Minero footballers
Cienciano footballers